Paris Township is one of the seventeen townships of Stark County, Ohio, United States.  The 2000 census found 5,969 people in the township, 3,938 of whom lived in the unincorporated portions of the township.

Geography
Located in the southeastern corner part of the county, it borders the following townships:
Washington Township - north
Knox Township, Columbiana County - northeast corner
West Township, Columbiana County - east
Augusta Township, Carroll County - southeast corner
Brown Township, Carroll County - south
Osnaburg Township - west
Nimishillen Township - northwest

Part of the village of Minerva is located in southeastern Paris Township, and three unincorporated communities lie in the township: New Franklin in the northeast, Paris in the northwest, and Robertsville in the west.

Name and history
Statewide, other Paris Townships are located in Portage and Union counties.

In 1833, Paris Township contained four gristmills, seven saw mills, one fulling mill, one tannery, and five stores.

Government

The township is governed by a three-member board of trustees, who are elected in November of odd-numbered years to a four-year term beginning on the following January 1. Two are elected in the year after the presidential election and one is elected in the year before it. There is also an elected township fiscal officer, who serves a four-year term beginning on April 1 of the year after the election, which is held in November of the year before the presidential election. Vacancies in the fiscal officership or on the board of trustees are filled by the remaining trustees.

References

External links
County website

Townships in Stark County, Ohio
Townships in Ohio